Christophe Tiozzo (born June 1, 1963 in St. Denis, France) is a French former professional boxer who held the Lineal and WBA super middleweight championship. In amateur boxing, Tiozzo won the bronze medal at light middleweight in the 1984 Summer Olympics. He is the older brother of former two-division world champion of boxing, Fabrice Tiozzo.

Amateur boxing career

Record:85–6–2 (24)
1982 French National Championship Light Middleweights: Gold Medalist
Defeated Alain Cuvillier
Defeated Fabien Khodri
Defeated Did-Ali Lokchiri
Defeated Patrick Magnetto
1982 European Junior Championship at Schwerin, Germany as a Light Middleweight
Defeated Graciano Rocchigiani (Federal Republic of Germany)
Lost to Shararov (USSR)
1983 French National Championship as a Light Middleweight: Gold Medalist
Defeated Bernard Razzano  TKO 3
Defeated Jean-Luc Charme  TKO 2
Defeated Gilbert Dele  TKO 3
Defeated Michel Moukory  kot 3
1983: European Championship at Varna as a Light Middleweight
Lost to Ralf Hunger (Democratic Republic of Germany)
1984 French National Championship as a Middleweight: Bronze Medalist
Defeated Jean-Max Delnard
Lost to François Berardino  by forfeit
1984 Olympic Games at Los Angeles, California, USA as a Light Middleweight: Bronze Medalist
Defeated Suleymana Sadik (Ghana)  points
Defeated Vicky Byarubaga (Uganda) points
Defeated Israel Cole (Sierra Leone) points
Lost to Shawn O'Sullivan (Canada)  points
1985: French National Championship as a Middleweight: Gold Medalist
Defeated Pascal Stroh  AB 2
Defeated Christophe Girard  TKO 2
Defeated Moktar Bekheira
Defeated Hamedidi Maimoun
1985: European Championship at Budapest, Hungary as a Middleweight
Defeated Boliguzov (USSR)
Defeated Maricescu (Romania) (Eliminated for failing drug test)

Professional boxing career
Tiozzo began his professional boxing career in 1985 and won his first 28 bouts, winning the WBA and Lineal Super Middleweight Titles by beating In-Chul Baek in 1990 by TKO. Tiozzo successfully defended the belt twice, losing it in 1991 to Víctor Córdoba by 9th-round TKO. In 1992 he challenged WBC Light Heavyweight Title holder Jeff Harding, but lost by TKO.  He retired in 1996 with a record of 33-2-0.

Professional boxing record

See also
List of super middleweight boxing champions
List of WBA world champions

References

External links
 
Christophe Tiozzo CBZ profile

1963 births
Living people
French people of Italian descent
Light-middleweight boxers
Boxers at the 1984 Summer Olympics
Olympic boxers of France
Olympic bronze medalists for France
Olympic medalists in boxing
French male boxers
Medalists at the 1984 Summer Olympics
Competitors at the 1983 Mediterranean Games
Mediterranean Games bronze medalists for France
Mediterranean Games medalists in boxing
Sportspeople from Saint-Denis, Seine-Saint-Denis